The Confederation of Vocational Unions (YS) is a national trade union center, an  umbrella organization of labour unions in Norway.

It was established in 1977 as a non-partisan alternative to the Norwegian Confederation of Trade Unions (LO). It is affiliated to the International Trade Union Confederation, the European Trade Union Confederation, the Council of Nordic Trade Unions and the Trade Union Advisory Committee to the OECD.

Affiliates

Presidents
1977: Egil Sandberg
1981: Eldri Langåker
1986: Gunnar Caspersen (acting)
1987: Jan Andersen-Gott
1993: Eva Bjøreng
1996: Randi Bjørgen
2006: Tore Eugen Kvalheim
2013: Jorunn Berland

References

 
Trade unions established in 1977
Supraorganizations
Organisations based in Oslo
Trade unions in Norway